"Love Is a Drug" is a song by Australian rock band Eskimo Joe. It was released in June 2011 as the second single from their fifth studio album titled Ghosts of the Past. The song peaked at number 38 on the ARIA Singles Chart.

At the ARIA Music Awards of 2011, the song was nominated for ARIA Award for Best Video.

At the APRA Music Awards of 2012, the song was nominated for Rock Work of the Year.

Charts

Release history

References

Eskimo Joe songs
2011 singles
Songs written by Kavyen Temperley
Songs written by Stuart MacLeod (musician)
Songs written by Joel Quartermain
2010 songs
Warner Music Australasia singles